is a commuter railway line in Tokyo, Japan, operated by the private railway operator Seibu Railway. The line connects Nerima Station and Toshimaen Station, both in Nerima, Tokyo. It runs parallel to the Toei Oedo Line.

Stations

History
The line opened on 15 October 1927, between Nerima Station and Toshima Station (present-day Toshimaen Station.

Station numbering was introduced on all Seibu Railway lines during fiscal 2012, with Seibu Toshima Line stations numbered prefixed with the letters "SI" (part of the Seibu Ikebukuro group of lines).

References

Railway lines in Tokyo
Toshima Line
1067 mm gauge railways in Japan